Paul Beard may refer to:
Paul Beard (spiritualist) (1904–2002), author and president of the College of Psychic Studies, London
Paul Beard (violinist) (1901–1989), leader of the London Philharmonic and BBC Symphony Orchestras
See Spektrum RC for Paul Beard (inventor), inventor of the spread spectrum